The 2013 mayoral election in Jackson, Mississippi took place on June 4, 2013, alongside other Jackson municipal races. City councilman Chokwe Lumumba was elected mayor in a landslide in the general election after defeating Jonathan Lee and incumbent mayor Harvey Johnson, Jr. in the primary.

Democratic primary

General election

References

2013 United States mayoral elections
Mayoral elections in Jackson, Mississippi